1979 World Masters Athletics Championships is the third in a series of World Masters Athletics Outdoor Championships (called World Veterans Championships at the time) that took place in Hannover, Germany, from 27 July to 2 August 1979.

The main venue was Niedersachsenstadion, which featured a new Olympic-style electronic scoreboard.

This stadium has since been rebuilt several times, most extensively in 2003/04. Cross Country was held at Sportpark Hannover in Galgenberg.

This edition of masters athletics Championships had a minimum age limit of 35 years for women and 40 years for men.

The governing body of this series is World Association of Veteran Athletes (WAVA). WAVA was formed during meeting at the inaugural edition of this series at Toronto in 1975, then officially founded during the second edition in 1977, then renamed as World Masters Athletics (WMA) at the Brisbane Championships in 2001.

This Championships was organized by WAVA in coordination with a Local Organising Committee (LOC) of German Athletics Association and K. Wilhelm Köster.

In addition to a full range of track and field events,

non-stadia events included 10K Cross Country, 10K Race Walk (women), 20K Race Walk (men), and Marathon.

Controversy
In 1976, the International Amateur Athletic Federation (IAAF) had expelled the Amateur Athletic Union of South Africa due to the apartheid policy of the South African government at that time,

though the WAVA constitution was written in 1977 to be independent of IAAF,

stating that

Citing the fact that South Africa had been excluded from the Summer Olympic Games since 1968, DLV meet organizers initially planned to ban South African athletes. After much discussion, a compromise was reached to allow  athletes to compete under the flag of Rhodesia.

Results
Past Championships results are archived at WMA.

Additional archives are available from Museum of Masters Track & Field

as a pdf book,

as a searchable pdf,

and in pdf newsletters from National Masters News.

Selected winners are archived at Athletics Weekly for women

and for men.

Rare photographs of the blind sprinter Fritz Assmy in competition were included in newspaper clippings from the Museum of Masters Track & Field pdf book, guided by his son-in-law Klaus Hinrichsen in lane 8.

Assmy won the M60 100m, 200m, and 400m sprints, anchored the German M60 4 x 100 relay team to gold in a Championships Record time of 50.32, and anchored the German M60 4 x 400 relay team to 4th place.

Several masters world records were set at this Championships. John Gilmour broke 4 world records by himself.

World records for 1979 are from the list of new records in the Museum of Masters Track & Field searchable pdf unless otherwise noted.

Women

Men

References

World Masters Athletics Championships
World Masters Athletics Championships
International athletics competitions hosted by Germany
1979
Masters athletics (track and field) records